Wilroads Gardens is an unincorporated community in Ford County, Kansas, United States.  As of the 2020 census, the population of the community and nearby areas was 639.

Demographics

For statistical purposes, the United States Census Bureau has defined Wilroads Gardens as a census-designated place (CDP).

References

Further reading

External links
 Ford County maps: Current, Historic - KDOT

Unincorporated communities in Kansas
Unincorporated communities in Ford County, Kansas
Census-designated places in Kansas
Census-designated places in Ford County, Kansas